The 2016–17 North Florida Ospreys women's basketball team represented the University of North Florida in the 2016–17 NCAA Division I women's basketball season. The Ospreys, led by second year head coach Darrick Gibbs, played their games at UNF Arena and were members of the Atlantic Sun Conference. They finished the season 10–20, 3–11 in A-Sun play to finish in a tie for sixth place. They lost in the quarterfinals of A-Sun Tournament to Florida Gulf Coast.

Media
All home games and conference road games were shown on ESPN3 or A-Sun.TV.

Roster

Schedule

|-
!colspan=9 style="background:#031B49; color:white;"| Non-conference regular season

|-
!colspan=9 style="background:#031B49; color:white;"| Atlantic Sun regular season

|-
!colspan=9 style="background:#031B49; color:white;"|Atlantic Sun Women's Tournament

See also
 2016–17 North Florida Ospreys men's basketball team

References

North Florida
North Florida Ospreys women's basketball seasons
North Florida
North Florida